Kjell Sverre Johansen (20 June 1944 – 7 October 1998) was a Norwegian rower. He competed at the 1972 Summer Olympics and the 1976 Summer Olympics.

References

1944 births
1998 deaths
Norwegian male rowers
Olympic rowers of Norway
Rowers at the 1972 Summer Olympics
Rowers at the 1976 Summer Olympics
Place of birth missing